is a Japanese politician of the Democratic Party of Japan, a member of the House of Representatives in the Diet (national legislature). A native of Higashiibaraki District, Ibaraki, he attended the Musashi Institute of Technology as both undergraduate and graduate. He was elected to the assembly of Ibaraki Prefecture where he served for one term and then to the House of Representatives for the first time in 1990 as a member of the Japan Socialist Party.

References

External links 
 Official website in Japanese.

1947 births
Living people
Politicians from Ibaraki Prefecture
Members of the House of Representatives (Japan)
Social Democratic Party (Japan) politicians
Democratic Party of Japan politicians
Ministers of Land, Infrastructure, Transport and Tourism of Japan
21st-century Japanese politicians